The Micrococcales are an order of bacteria in the phylum Actinomycetota.

Phylogeny
The currently accepted taxonomy is based on the List of Prokaryotic names with Standing in Nomenclature and the phylogeny is based on whole-genome sequences.

Notes

References

Actinomycetia
Bacteria orders